The 2008 Champions League Twenty20 was scheduled to be the first edition of the Champions League Twenty20, an international club cricket tournament. It was due to be held in India between December 3 and December 10, 2008, where the winners were to earn around US$6 million. The 2008 Mumbai attacks just one week prior to the tournament resulted in its postponement. It was proposed that the tournament be held in early 2009, though dates for its rearrangement could not be found and the tournament was cancelled on December 12, 2008. The league was planned and successfully executed as the 2009 Champions League Twenty20.

Format 
The tournament has eight teams and is divided into a group stage and a knockout stage. If a match ends in a tie, a Super Over will be played to determine the winner. The group stage has the teams divided into two equal groups, with each playing a round-robin tournament. The top two teams of each group advance to the knockout stage. The knockout stage consists of two semi-finals, with the top team of one group facing the second from the other. The winners of the semi-finals play the grand final to determine the winner of the competition.

Points awarded in the group stage:

Teams 
Eight teams from five nations were invited for the tournament.

English participation 
The organisers of the tournament confirmed that any team competing would be banned from fielding players who have competed in the Indian Cricket League, a rival to the Indian Premier League. As a result of this, the participation of English and Welsh teams in the tournament was put in jeopardy. For the 2008 season, 15 of the 18 counties fielded 25 players from the ICL. On 24 July 2008, IPL commissioner Lalit Modi confirmed their stance by stating that only Middlesex and Essex stood a chance of being invited to the Champions League because they did not have ICL links.

Venues 
Three venues were chosen to host the league and knockout matches. Mumbai and Bangalore were chosen instead of Rajasthan Royals' home stadium which was under renovations. Chennai Super Kings' Chepauk Stadium was chosen to play two of the three matches the team had to play. The first semi-final was supposed to be held at Bangalore while the second semi-final and the final was to be held at Chennai.

Aftermath 
The teams participating especially the IPL teams were extremely disheartened with the cancelling of league. Both the Chennai Super Kings and the Rajasthan Royals received $1.3 million as compensation whereas the other teams were also offered petty amounts.

References

External links 
 CricInfo Champions League Twenty20 minisite

Champions League Twenty20